John Chamberlain Clark (January 14, 1793 – October 25, 1852) was an American lawyer and politician who served four terms as a United States representative from New York from 1827 to 1829 and from 1837 to 1843.

Biography
Clark was born in Pittsfield, Massachusetts, on January 14, 1793. He graduated from Williams College in Williamstown, Massachusetts, in 1811. Clark then studied law, was admitted to the bar and commenced practice in Hamilton, New York.

Political career 
In 1818, Clark moved to Bainbridge. A Democratic-Republican, then a Jacksonian and later a Democrat, he served as District Attorney of Chenango County from 1823 to 1827.

Tenure in Congress 
In 1826, he was elected to the United States House of Representatives 21 District and he served in the 20th United States Congress, March 4, 1827 to March 3, 1829. He resumed practicing law and in 1836 returned to the U.S. House, again representing the 21st District. He began his term as a Democrat, but switched to the Whig Party in 1837 because he favored continuation of the Second Bank of the United States rather than the independent Treasury favored by President Martin Van Buren and the Democrats. Clark was re-elected to Congress as a Whig in 1838 and 1840, ultimately serving in the 25th, 26th, and 27th Congresses (March 4, 1837 – March 3, 1843).

Later career and death 
Clark did not run for re-election in 1842, and resumed practicing law. He later moved to Chemung County and became active in the lumber business. Following the Whig victory in the 1848 election for President, Clark was appointed First Auditor of the Treasury and he served from August 2, 1849, to October 31, 1849. He was Solicitor of the United States Treasury from October 31, 1849, until his death.

Clark died in Elmira on October 25, 1852. He was buried at St. Peter's Churchyard in Bainbridge.

External links
 
 

1793 births
1852 deaths
Williams College alumni
New York (state) Whigs
United States Department of the Treasury officials
Jacksonian members of the United States House of Representatives from New York (state)
19th-century American politicians
Democratic Party members of the United States House of Representatives from New York (state)
Whig Party members of the United States House of Representatives
Politicians from Pittsfield, Massachusetts
People from Bainbridge, New York

Members of the United States House of Representatives from New York (state)